Gino Ravenna (born 30 August 1889, date of death unknown) was an Italian gymnast. He competed in the men's team event at the 1908 Summer Olympics. He was killed in the Auschwitz concentration camp during World War II.

References

1889 births
Year of death missing
Italian male artistic gymnasts
Olympic gymnasts of Italy
Gymnasts at the 1908 Summer Olympics
Place of birth missing
Italian people who died in Auschwitz concentration camp